Arthur Rushen (30 June 1884 – 1968) was a British cyclist. He won a gold medal at the 1906 Intercalated Games and competed in one event at the 1908 Summer Olympics.

References

External links
 

1884 births
1968 deaths
British male cyclists
Olympic cyclists of Great Britain
Cyclists at the 1906 Intercalated Games
Cyclists at the 1908 Summer Olympics
Place of birth missing